Pitcairnia nortefluminensis is a plant species in the genus Pitcairnia. This species is endemic to Venezuela.

References

nortefluminensis
Flora of Brazil
Flora of Venezuela